State Highway 123 (RJ SH 123, SH 123) is a state highway in Rajasthan state of India that connects Bhahrowanda in Sawai Madhopur district of Rajasthan with Jagner in Agra district of Uttar Pradesh.

SH-123 was designated by upgrading Major District Road 3. This highway connects NH 552 in Bhahrowanda to SH 39 in Jagner.

References

External links

State Highways in Rajasthan